Fentonbury is a rural locality in the local government area (LGA) of Central Highlands in the Central LGA region of Tasmania. The 2016 census recorded a population of 71 for the state suburb of Fentonbury.

History 
Fentonbury was gazetted as a locality in 1959. The name is believed to come from a settler named Michael Fenton in the district in 1830.

Geography
Almost all the boundaries are survey lines.

Road infrastructure 
Route C608 (Ellendale Road) runs through from north-west to south-east.

References

Towns in Tasmania
Localities of Central Highlands Council